Bal Dheri is one of the 51 union councils of Abbottabad District in Khyber-Pakhtunkhwa province of Pakistan, the union council of Baldheri is named after the main village of the area. The population of Baldheri Union Council is 14,796.

Location 
The village of Baldheri itself is situated at 34°15'0N 73°12'0E which is about 11 km east of Abbottabad city centre on the route towards Mansehra on the main Mansehra Road. Geographically Mansehra lies directly to the north, but the hilly terrain results in these winding roads, hence Baldheri is en route to Mansehra from Abbottabad city.

Baldheri has an average elevation of 1143 metres (3753 feet). The area covered by Baldheri union council, is between Ferozabad village to Tanan Village and Mangal to Halmaira.

Subdivisions 
 Bal Dheri
 Jalal Pura
 Mor Kalan
 Tannan
 Gojri
 Sajikot
 Halmera Tarla
 Halmera Utla

Geography 

Like much of the Abbottabad area, the terrain and layout of land make Baldheri a very beautiful place, with fresh water streams running down from the hills and mountains. The main stream is called Mangal, and its water is very important for the cultivation of the area. There are primary schools almost in every village. Bach Christian Hospital is also located in Baldheri UC, this hospital was very important during the 2005 Pakistan earthquake that struck the area, due to its location on the Karakoram Highway.

References

Union councils of Abbottabad District